Jagdish Raj Dubey is an Indian politician and member of the Janata Dal. Dubey is a member of the Jammu and Kashmir Legislative Assembly from the Bishnah constituency in Jammu district.

References 

People from Jammu
Janata Dal politicians
Jammu and Kashmir MLAs 1996–2002
Living people
Year of birth missing (living people)